The tournament in Nanchang was a new addition to the WTA 125K series.

Chuang Chia-jung and Junri Namigata won the title, defeating Chan Chin-wei and Xu Yifan in the final, 7–6(7–4), 6–3.

Seeds

Draw

References 
 Draw

Jiangxi International Women's Tennis Open - Doubles
Jiangxi International Women's Tennis Open